A disposable ship, also called raft ship, timber ship, or timber drogher is a ship or sea vessel that is intended for use on a single voyage. At the final destination, the vessel is broken up for sale or reuse of materials. Until the end of the 19th century, such ships were common on major rivers such as the Danube and the Rhine in Central Europe and the Mississippi in North America. There were also saltwater vessels that were primarily built for one-time sailing to break up. Some of the largest wooden ships in history were of this type.

Downstream navigation 

On all major navigable rivers around the world, there is a current that flows towards the estuary, so it is possible to float with the water flow, and the only instruments needed are anchors and rudders to maneuver the vessel down the river. It became possible to sail upstream with the advent of steam power, without which vessels had to use sails if the current was not too strenuous, or manual force in the form of ox or horse pulling, and people wearing towbars. It was thus convenient for shipping companies and traders to send cargo by barge-like vessels of a simple construction, on a one-way trip to the end destinations of the Central European rivers, including the Upper and Middle Rhines.

In North America, as the land around the Mississippi was cleared and developed, there was a need for cheap transportation to the larger port cities such as New Orleans, and as on the inner Central European rivers, it was not possible to return upstream. Agricultural goods such as potatoes, tobacco, cotton, alcoholic beverages (whiskey), grain, and live animals (cattle, chickens, and pigs) could be transported on a flatboat. Farmer Jacob Yoder of Pennsylvania built the first flatboat at Old Redstone Fort on the Monongahela River in 1781. His parents had come from Switzerland, where the navigable rivers and lakes had flat-bottomed boats known as Weidling for fishing, freight and passenger transport. Yoder designed a boat that was nothing more than a simple box whose construction was so simple that it could be built by inexperienced people with tools and little boat building skills, and thus could be carried by the current on the rivers.

The farmers would sell their agricultural products and the boat they had brought. Upon sale, the boat was broken up to reuse the wood that had been built into the structure. As wheel steamers took over the traffic, it led to a short-term upswing in the use of the flatboats, as the farmers could return home within a few days, or get the flatboats in tow upstream to the starting point. In the middle of the 19th century, wheeled steamers and railways began to replace flatboats, as machine-driven transport was faster and more capable. Abraham Lincoln had served as a flatboatman in 1828 and 1831.

Belyanas, disposable ships for timber rafting, were used in Russia from 16th to 20th centuries around the Volga and Vetluga rivers. Some of the largest vessels were more than 120-meter-long and could carry around 12,000 tons. They were common until the beginning of the 20th century, when the railway began to take over timber transport.

In the 400s BC Herodotus wrote of disposable boats sailing from Armenia to Bablyon.

Timber freight over the sea 
 

The disposable ship avoided two problems that adversely impacted profitability of shipping in the British timber trade; high taxes and small cargoes.
  
The structural timbers of a "disposable ship" were exempt from high British taxes imposed on "oak and square pine timber" cargoes. In the 19th century, these taxes eventually reached 275% of the value of the timber cargo. Further, the return voyage from England to North America was unnecessary. Typically, return trip cargo volume was one-tenth that of the timbers brought to England. This usually required the use of ballast stones to establish the proper vessel trim and maneuverability. Ballast stones had no significant commercial value and ballast loading and unloading was costly and time-consuming.

The first ship, the Columbus, was launched on July 28, 1824 from the slipway at Anse-du-Fort, the island of Orleans near the city of Quebec, after being built by Charles Wood of Port Glasgow. Wood had ensured that the construction could be broken up and that the ship's timber in the hull could be reused. Thus, the four-masted bark ship was flat-bottomed and barely elegant as a sailing ship, beyond its dimensions, which are stated at 93.8 m (308 feet) keel length, 15.8 m (52 feet) wide and 9.1 m (30 feet) high with register tonnage of 3,700 tonnes and cargo tonnage of 7,500 tonnes. With a load of 10,000 tonnes of timber, Columbus was towed by the tugboat Hercules and taken out to sea where it then sailed out on 6 September. Captain William Mckellar grounded at Bersimis in St. Lawrence on September 9, but continued on and reached the anchorage known as The Downs off the coast of Kent. From there, Columbus was brought into Blackwall Reach where the cargo was brought ashore. But the shipowners wanted to send the ship back to Canada against the shipbuilder's advice. On the way out, the ship sank as a total loss on the English Channel on May 17, 1825.

The success of Columbus despite the sinking due to a mistake was followed by the launch of Baron of Renfrew in June 1825, but then it turned out that although the construction remained the same with right sides, the new ship had been enlarged, as that when one tried to launch it for the first time, it caught fire while sliding on the slip. The dimensions have subsequently been provided to 92.65 meters (304 feet) in length, 18.59 (61 feet) meters in width and 10.36 meters in height with a registry tonnage of 5,295 tons and cargo tonnage of 9,000 tons.

With Captain Matthew Walker and a crew of 25 men, the Baron of Renfrew sailed out to the Atlantic on August 23, 1825. Like the Columbus, the ship reached the European Atlantic coast when it sailed into the English Channel on October 21. But there had been a leak on board the Baron of Renbow which eventually took in more and more water, and became waterlogged as a result. The four-masted bark ship then grounded on Goodwin Sands at Long Sound Head. The captain then chose to leave the ship and left the salvage to two tugboats who came to assistance. During the shipwreck, the ship was broken into three pieces which eventually came into operation with the ocean currents, and ended up on the beaches of Calais on 24 October. The timber could still be salvaged so the transportation was successful. The two ships were described as "rafts" in their time, and attracted attention with their unusual construction and size, with the Baron of Renfrew being 110.8 meters (363 feet) long. But they were a one-time attempt as it was no longer profitable to transport timber from North America to Britain. The Baron of Renfrew was one of the largest wooden sailing vessels ever built.

After the loss of the two disposable ships in the year 1825, not only the British timber market had changed when they reoriented towards the Baltic coast again. This ended with the acceptance of the principle of free trade in 1840, which, among other things, saw the repeal of the Navigation Act in 1849. By then, the British had long ago begun to seek foreign timber as far away as Burma.

Timber freight as a raft 

Timber rafts have existed from time immemorial as disposable vessels as they were usually just logs attached to each other for temporary duration, and it was very common for the timber rafts at the terminus to be broken up for sale of the logs. But sometimes naval structures were constructed that turned these into refined sea craft.

A second form of transport was by laying the logs on top of each other in several layers. This method was used on the Central European rivers. There, the growing need for timber led to a large naval structures being seen on the Rhine and other rivers. The largest could be up to 500 meters long and 80 meters wide with a height or thickness of up to 3 meters. They were called Kapitalflöße and had up to 51,000 m³ in timber capacity. A typical Holländervlot en route to the Netherlands could be 200 meters long and 40 meters wide. As such a large vessel had to be able to navigate through narrow and winding river courses, the fleet had many small boats with it, a large crew and many oars - very large and long oars up to 21 meters in length were used. The raft was "articulated", in that it could bend in several sections, the front and aft were called "knees". Several buildings had been erected in the middle, as the crew could consist of several hundred men, up to 500 to 800 of the largest. Gradually the giant fleets were broken up, but it was only when they reached Dordrecht or Rotterdam that they were broken up into smaller pieces and taken ashore or carried on. Due to its size, other ship traffic on the river had to be stopped as the fleets floated downstream, because the fragile composition meant that the fleets had to have the right to navigate all navigable rivers. They were difficult to handle, with braking distances of up to 2 km despite many anchors that were included. With steam-powered boats, timber hauling gradually became commonplace, and from 1952 it was no longer allowed to let the timber rafts drift downstream without tugs.

See also 
 Timber rafting

Further reading 
 Robert Gardiner; Conway`s History of the ship: The Heyday of Sail The Merchant Sailing Ship 1650-1830 Conway Maritime Press 1995 ISBN 0 85177 644 2
 Wallace, Fredrick William: Wooden Ships and Iron Men. White Lion, London, 1973/1924.
 Williams, David M.: Bulk Carriers and Timber Imports: The British North American Trade and the Shipping Boom of 1824-5. The Mariner's Mirror Vol. 54, London, 1968. pp. 373–382
 Wood, Charles: Ballast. John Clark, Glasgow, 1836.
 Jenny Sarrazin, André van Holk: Schopper und Zillen. Eine Einführung in den traditionellen Holzschiffbau im Gebiet der deutschen Donau. Kabel Verlag, Hamburg 1996, ISBN 3-8225-0334-7.
 Karl Ebner: Flöszerei und Schiffahrt auf Binnengewässern mit besonderer Berücksichtigung der Holztransporte in Österreich, Deutschland und Westruszland. Wien und Leipzig 1912
 Ernst Neweklowsky: Die Schiffahrt auf der Donau und ihren Nebenflüssen. In: Deutsches Museum. Berichte und Abhandlungen, 26. Jg., Heft 3. 1952 
 Michael Sohn: Kaffenkähne. Eine vergangene Binnenschiffsform. Eigenverlag Sohn-Art, Hennigsdorf 2013, ISBN 978-3-00-041659-0.
 Kurt Schaefer: Historische Schiffe in Wien. Neuer Wissenschaftlicher Verlag GmbH, 2002, ISBN 978-3-7083-0037-5.

References 

Tax avoidance
History of forestry in the United States
Forestry in Canada
Lumber ships
Ship types
Disposable products